The 1924–25 season was Port Vale's sixth consecutive season of football (19th overall) in the English Football League. A highly successful season, for the first time in their history they finished above rivals Stoke. Vale's eighth-place finish in the second tier was their best finish since 1893–94. Throughout the 20th century, this finish would be bettered only in 1930–31 (they would finish third in the Second Division in 1992–93, however by then the Second Division was actually the third tier in the Football League behind the Premier League).

Their success was down primarily to the goalscoring efforts of young Wilf Kirkham, who netted 33 goals in 44 games. This was combined with a settled team, which saw just fifteen regular players supplemented by seven reserve players.

Overview

Second Division
The pre-season saw the arrival of three new players: veteran Everton goalkeeper Tom Fern, young half-back Sidney Blunt, and winger Billy Tempest made the leap from Stoke to Vale.

The season started with a lose-one-win-one sequence of six games; significantly, the final game of this sequence was a 1–0 win over Stoke at the Victoria Ground, Bob Connelly scoring the goal. The "Valiants" followed this with five games without a win, and "a certain section of the crowd" became "prone to gibe and jeer at mistakes", which had a noticeable effect on the side's confidence. Goals were a problem, and so the directors took the decision to sell full-back Len Birks to Sheffield United for 'a substantial sum', promising to spend the money on forwards. They duly signed Alfred Strange from Portsmouth.

The team bobbed along at mid-table, and on 20 December were expected to be turned over by promotion-chasing Manchester United; however Vale managed to record a 2–1 win. The difficult games continued, as two games in as many days came against eventual champions Leicester City; they were thumped 7–0 at Filbert Street on Christmas Day. Johnny Duncan scored six of the "Foxes" seven goals (a Leicester record).

The second half of the season would prove to be a brilliant one for the club. They won ten of their first thirteen league games of 1925, including a 2–0 win over Stoke at The Old Recreation Ground – former "Potter" Tempest getting a goal against his former employers. The defence were absolutely solid, keeping clean sheets in nine of these thirteen games.

Whilst on the South Coast of England the players were rewarded for their hard work with a relaxing holiday, seeing sights such as the Isle of Wight, the Southampton docks, HMS Victory, the Newbury races, and music hall star Gertie Gitana performing at the theatre. Following this, manager Joe Schofield took advantage of a comfortable league position by experimenting with his starting eleven. Just four points were picked up from their last nine games, this included a 1–0 defeat at Stamford Bridge in front of 30,000 and a 4–0 defeat at Old Trafford in front of 40,000. However Kirkham did bag his third hat-trick of the season against Stockport County.

At the end of season, Vale picked up a club record 42 Football League points, with Kirkham scoring a club record 26 league goals. Outside of Kirkham however, the club were finding difficulties in front of goal, and had to be much more prolific in order to challenge for promotion. They were fifteen points off the top two, and eight points clear of the bottom two.

Jack Lowe was an ever-present in both league and cup, whereas Kirkham and Briscoe each missed just the one game. Fern, Connelly, and Blunt also were highly consistent. At the end of the campaign all of the first team performers were retained.

Finances
The club finally found themselves on a sound financial footing, making a record £4,469 profit on the campaign. The club debt went down to £134, and the club decided to purchase The Old Recreation Ground outright, putting down a deposit of £2,250.

Cup competitions
In the FA Cup, the Vale managed to qualify for the First Round Proper for the first time since 1921–22. Kirkham and Briscoe scored a combined total of ten goals in the games against Midland League Boston and Central Alliance side Alfreton, with Strange contributing three. This set up a difficult encounter with First Division Aston Villa at Villa Park, and Vale were easily outclassed in the second-half, despite leading 1–0 at the break, they finished the game with a 7–2 defeat. The nine goals scored amounted to a club record aggregate score in the competition.

League table

Results
Port Vale's score comes first

Football League Second Division

Results by matchday

Matches

FA Cup

Player statistics

Appearances

Top scorers

Transfers

Transfers in

Transfers out

References
Specific

General

Port Vale F.C. seasons
Port Vale